The Daniel J. Evans School of Public Policy and Governance is the school of public policy of the University of Washington in Seattle, Washington. The school is named after former Washington State Governor and U.S. Senator Daniel J. Evans.

The Evans School emphasizes policy analysis and management through its undergraduate minor, master's degree programs, doctoral program, and non-degree and certificate programs.

, U.S. News & World Report ranked the Evans School as tied for 3rd out of 275 schools of public affairs. The U.S. News & World Report also ranked the Evans School for its expertise in the areas of Environmental Policy and Management (#2), Local Government Management (#18), Nonprofit Management (#5), Public Finance & Budgeting (#8 tie), Public Management & Leadership (#11), Public Policy Analysis (#14), Social Policy (#12), and Urban Policy (#27).

History and campus 
The school was formerly known as the Graduate School of Public Affairs, and was founded in 1962 as the first school of public affairs at a public university. It was renamed in 1999 to honor former Washington State Governor and U.S. Senator Daniel J. Evans.

The Evans School is located in Parrington Hall at the University of Washington in Seattle. Parrington Hall opened in 1902 as the University's science building and is named after Vernon L. Parrington, an English professor at the University from 1908 to 1929. It underwent a $24M renovation in 2019–20 to modernize the historic facility, achieving LEED Gold standards. The facility reopened in September 2020 with new classrooms outfitted with the technology and spaces needed to support engaged learning and community discussions.

Academic experience

Academic programs 
The academic programs at the Evans School are ranked among top public policy and management programs in the nation and feature world-renowned faculty teaching at the intersection of theory and practice. The curriculum and culture are defined by a tradition of rigorous study, innovative research, and, most importantly, a commitment to public service. These academic programs include:

 Master's Degrees in Public Administration (including an Executive program for mid-career professionals)
 Undergraduate Minor in Public Policy
 Ph.D. in Public Policy & Management
 Joint & Concurrent Degrees

Concurrent degrees
The Evans School also offers concurrent master's degrees with other University of Washington programs, including:
UW Henry M. Jackson School of International Studies
UW School of Environmental & Forest Sciences
UW School of Law
UW School of Public Health
UW School of Social Work
UW Urban Design & Planning

Student Consulting Lab 
For more than two decades, the Evans School Student Consulting Lab (formerly Public Service Clinics) has been producing program evaluations, strategic plans, policy analyses, and new program proposals that address the real-world needs of public, nonprofit, philanthropic, and private organizations. These students are not interns helping with day-to-day administrative tasks; they are project-focused professionals working independently with key guidance from faculty advisors and periodic assistance from the employing organization.

Research impact

Areas of expertise 
Evans School faculty and research specializations cover a broad array of disciplines related to public policy, management, and governance, including:

 Environmental Policy & Management
 International Development
 Metropolitan & Urban Policy
 Nonprofit Management & Philanthropy
 Public Finance & Budgeting
 Public Leadership, Management, & Decision-Making
 Public Policy Analysis & Evaluation
 Social Policy: Poverty, Education, and Social Welfare

Research centers and partners
In addition to the research work of individual faculty members, the Evans School research centers and research partners provide policy analyses for issues at the state, regional, national, and international levels.
The Evans School Policy Analysis and Research Group
Marc Lindenberg Center for Humanitarian Action, International Development, and Global Citizenship
West Coast Poverty Center (a collaborative venture between the Evans School, the School of Social Work, and College of Arts and Sciences at the University of Washington)
William D. Ruckelshaus Center

Student organizations 
The Evans School Student Organization (ESO) serves as the liaison between the Evans School student body and the faculty and administration. 
ESO places students on most faculty committees and plays a key role in:

 Developing curriculum
 Hiring faculty members
 Shaping academic policies
 Evaluating courses and professors
 Setting degree requirements

Other student organizations include:

 Evans Coalitions for Housing Outreach (ECHO)
Evans Network of Women (Now)
Evans People of Color (E-POC)
Evans International Students Association (EISA)
 Graduate Environmental Policy Forum (GreenEvans)
International Development Interest Group (IDIG)
 Partnership for Community & Diversity (PCD)
Out in Public (OiP)
 UW International City/County Management Association (ICMA) Student Chapter

Elected alumni 
 Sally J. Clark, Former Seattle City Council Member
 Karen Fraser, Washington State Senator
 Bob Hasegawa, Washington State Senator
Nicole Macri, Washington State Representative
 Joe McDermott (politician), King County Council
 Mark Mullet, Washington State Senator
Marcus Riccelli, Washington State Representative 
Norman B. Rice, Former City of Seattle Mayor (1990–1997)
Christine Rolfes, Washington State Senator
Vandana Slatter, Washington State Representative
Stephan Blanford, Seattle Schools Board of Directors

Accreditation 
The Evans School's MPA program is accredited by NASPAA, the National Association of Schools of Public Affairs and Administration.

References

External links 
 
 The Evans Policy Analysis and Research Group
 Cascadia Coastline and Peoples Hazards Research Hub (CoPes)
 Center on Risk and Inclusion in Food Systems (CRIFS)
 International Program in Public Health Leadership (IPPHL)
 William D. Ruckelshaus Center

Colleges, schools, and departments of the University of Washington
Educational institutions established in 1962
Public administration schools in the United States
Public policy schools
1962 establishments in Washington (state)